Qasem Kandi (also Romanized as Qāsem Kandī) is a village in Pain Barzand Rural District of the Central District of Germi County, Ardabil province, Iran. (The rural district was originally in Angut District until most of that district formed the new Ungut County.) At the 2006 census, its population was 660 in 140 households. The following census in 2011 counted 519 people in 143 households. The latest census in 2016 showed a population of 494 people in 154 households; it was the largest village in its rural district.

References 

Germi County

Towns and villages in Germi County

Populated places in Ardabil Province

Populated places in Germi County